Generations: The Legacy, is a South African soap opera created and produced by Mfundi Vundla. It is a remake of the soap opera Generations, also created and produced by Vundla, but with many new and different characters, different settings and different tones. It is the second most watched television show in South Africa.

Cast

Main cast
{| class="wikitable"
! Actor
! Role
|-
|Manaka Ranaka
|Lucy Diale - Makhafola
|-
|Ronnie Nyakale
|Thembinkosi "Cosmo" Diale
|-
|Musa Ngema
|Mazwi Moroka
|-
|Pearl Monama
|Siphesihle "Sphe" Cele
|-
|Kope Makgae
|Moreri "Mrekza" Makhafola
|-
|Muzi Mthabela
|Nkosiyabo Cele
|-
|Andile Nebulane
|Daluxolo "Pele" Malinga
|-
|Refilwe Madumo
|Fikile Maponya
|-
|Samela Tyelbooi
|Ayanda Majola
|-
|Karabo Maseko
|Luyolo Dzedze
|-
|Oliphant Singo
|Mpho Phakade
|-
|Zizipho Buti
|Tracy
|-
|Mpume Nyamane
|Nozipho Cele
|-
|Mpho Molepo
|Kabisi Moroka
|-
|Buntu Petse
|Nontle Majola
|}

Recurring Cast

Former cast

In other media
A still from a scene depicting Tau Mogale remarking "Am I a joke to you?" is frequently used as a reaction image and Internet meme; it was first circulated on Twitter in 2016.

External links 

 Generations: The Legacy on Demand Africa

References	

South African television soap operas
2014 South African television series debuts